British School of Archaeology may refer to some of the British International Research Institutes supported by the British Academy, of which now there are eight:
 British School at Athens (BSA), archaeological research institute
 British School at Rome (BSR), interdisciplinary research centre
 British Institute at Ankara (BIAA), formerly the British Institute of Archaeology at Ankara
 British Institute for the Study of Iraq (BISI), London, formerly the British School of Archaeology in Iraq, Baghdad
 Council for British Research in the Levant, with two research institutes:
 Kenyon Institute, formerly the British School of Archaeology at Jerusalem (BSAJ)
 British Institute in Amman(BIA), formerly the British Institute at Amman for Archaeology and History (BIAAH)
 British Institute of Eastern Africa (BIEA), Nairobi, Kenya
 British Institute of Persian Studies, London, formerly Teheran (see Iran: Journal of the British Institute of Persian Studies)
 British Institute for Libyan & North African Studies, formerly the Society of Libyan Studies, at University of Leicester
 The British Institute of Afghan Studies, Kabul (1972-1982) is now defunct

See also
Other Institutes Overseas and Societies partly funded by the British Academy
 Egypt Exploration Society (EES), London, British non-profit organisation
 The Committee, Society, and School for South East Asian Studies